Jane T. Elfers is CEO and president of The Children's Place retail chain. She is the former chief executive of department store Lord & Taylor.
She is a 1983 graduate of Bucknell University and is a member of the Board of Trustees.

References

Elfers, Jane T.